Kasturi Thilakam is a 1970 Indian Tamil-language film written and directed by Malliyam Rajagopal. The film stars Sowcar Janaki, Major Sundarrajan and Nagesh. It is based on the play Aalamaram by Bilahari. The film was released on 8 August 1970.

Plot

Cast 
 Sowcar Janaki
 Major Sundarrajan
 Nagesh
 Sivakumar
 Srividya
 Lakshmi
 Kumari Padmini
 Kallapart Natarajan
 V. S. Raghavan

Production 
Kasturi Thilakam was written and directed by Malliyam Rajagopal, and produced by Raju M. Mathan under Kavitha Arts.

Soundtrack 
The soundtrack was composed by G. Devarajan.

References

External links 
 

1970s Tamil-language films
Films scored by G. Devarajan
Indian films based on plays